Qi yoga (Qi-Yoga) is a term occasionally used by practitioners mixing techniques or philosophies of Chinese Qigong and Hindu Yoga, see:
Tam Qui Khi-Kong
Tao yin (aka "Taoist yoga")
Yin yoga